The Cizre Dam is a proposed dam on the Tigris River north of Cizre, Turkey.  The Cizre Dam is to be built in conjunction and downstream of the Ilisu Dam.  The Cizre Dam is also one of the planned dams of Turkey's Southeastern Anatolia Project (GAP).  The purpose of the Cizre Dam is irrigation, hydro-power and to control the tailwaters of the Ilisu Dam.

A tender for the Cizre Dam was unsuccessfully issued in May 2008 but another issue on 15 May 2014 left Zorlu Energy as the winning bidder. The Cizre Dam will have a hydro-power capacity of 240 MW and will provide irrigation for 121,000 hectares.

References

External links

Dams in Şırnak Province
Hydroelectric power stations in Turkey
Southeastern Anatolia Project
Proposed hydroelectric power stations
Dams on the Tigris River
Proposed renewable energy power stations in Turkey